Bruce Sinclair (born 25 January 1965) is an Australian former professional rugby league footballer who played in the 1980s and 1990s.

Playing career
Recruited from Tamworth, Sinclair made his first grade debut for the Balmain Tigers in Round 24 of the 1986 NSWRL season. During his three seasons at the club, he played 13 games.

In 1989, Sinclair signed with the North Sydney Bears on a two-year contract, playing 15 games. In 1991, he moved to the Eastern Suburbs Roosters, where he played 50 games over four seasons. In 1992, he played his first full season of first grade, playing 21 of the Roosters' 22 games.

In 1995, he joined the newly-established North Queensland Cowboys, reuniting with his former Bears' teammate Kerry Boustead, who was the Cowboys' CEO. Sinclair was named the club captain for the inaugural season. He played 11 games that season, captaining the side four times, before retiring at the end of the season.

Statistics

NSWRL/ARL

References 

1965 births
Living people
Australian rugby league players
Balmain Tigers players
North Sydney Bears players
North Queensland Cowboys captains
North Queensland Cowboys players
Rugby league players from New South Wales
Rugby league props
Rugby league second-rows
Sydney Roosters players